World Cup Park is an ecological park built in Sangamdong-gil, in Seoul, South Korea. This place was built on May 1, 2002, to commemorate the 2002 Korea-Japan World Cup Games and the new millennium. World Cup Park is made up of five parks: Pyeonghwa (Peace) Park, Haneul (Sky) Park, Noeul (Sunset) Park, Nanjicheon Park, and Hangang Riverside Park.

History

Nanjido 
In late 1970s, a small islet in the northwest part of Seoul, called Nanjido, was made into a landfill due to the waste disposal problem that arose, due to the rapid development of Seoul into a metropolitan city. The park was once a 15-year-old landfill that consisted with 92 million tons of garbage, and it took 6 years to stabilize, and an extra year to build the park. The 2002 Korea-Japan World Cup Games led to the rebirth of Nanjido as an eco-friendly area.

Nanjido was developed by Nanji which is a branch of Hangang parting from the main river around Mangwonjeong and then rejoins the river near Haengjusansung(Hill Fortress). This place was used a dock for boating till the late Joseon period.

Before 1978 when the place was used as a landfill, peanuts and millet were cultivated on this land.

Five Parks

Pyeonghwa (Peace) Park 
Located on the opposite side of Seoul World Cup Stadium, it is the main park of World Cup Park created to commemorate the 2002 Korea-Japan World Cup Games. Its name was given to symbolize world peace and unity. There is UNICEF Plaza, Nanji Pond, Peace Park, Hope Forest, and the World Cup Park Museum.

Haneul Park 
Like its name Haneul, which means sky in Korean, the park is situated at World Cup Park's highest point. The Haneul stairs consist of 291 stairs and have become a tourist attraction. Situated at the highest point in World Cup Park, there are observation points on the sloping sides of the park.

Noeul Park 
Noeul Park is one of the favored parks in Seoul. The park contains wild animals such as deer, wildcats and raccoons. There is a sculpture park which is a themed space with nature and cultural art works displayed on green lawns.

Nanjicheon Park 
Nanjicheon Park was built along the Nanji Stream, which flowed under the Haneul Park. The stream was filled with sewage but it is now purified. It has an outdoor stage and various sports facilities.

Hangang Riverside Park (Nanji Area) 
Hangang Riverside Park was built on the banks of Han River (Korea). It has soccer field, basketball court, grass field, River cruise ship port, and an area for nature-studies.

Gallery

External links 
 http://english.visitkorea.or.kr/enu/ATR/SI_EN_3_1_1_1.jsp?cid=264454 - Tour guide by Korea Tourism Organization, Visitkorea

References 

Mapo District
Parks in Seoul